Melissa Elizabeth Banta (Riddle; after first marriage, Perrin; after second marriage, Banta; pen name, M. E. Banta; March 27, 1834 – May 1, 1907) was an American poet. She also wrote letters of travel. Banta died in 1907.

Early life and education
Melissa Elizabeth Riddle was born in Cheviot, a suburb of Cincinnati, Ohio, March 27, 1834. Her father, James Riddle, was of Scottish descent, and her mother, Elizabeth Jackson, a Quaker, was of English origin. Banta was the sole daughter of the house. She attended the Wesleyan Female Institute in Cincinnati until her fourteenth year, when, on the removal of the family to Covington, Kentucky, she was placed in the Female Collegiate Institute of that city, where she was graduated at the age of seventeen years.

Career
On August 29, 1852, she married Joseph I. Perrin, of Vicksburg, Mississippi. The young couple lived in Vicksburg, where the bride was a teacher in the public schools. He died of yellow fever at Vicksburgh, September 18, 1853. The widow's recollections of that time were vivid. Her poem, "The Gruesome Rain", embodied a grief, a regret and a hint of the horrors of that season. There, she remained for two months, until her parents dared to send for her. Fox, with characteristic southern warm-heartedness, had supplied all her needs and refused all proffered remuneration on the arrival of Dr. Mount, the old family physician. A daughter who was born at that time died in a few weeks, after which, Banta returned to her father's house.

Banta traveled twice to Europe and visited notable places in the United States. She wrote letters of travel in addition to her poetry.

Personal life
For the sake of an entire change of scene, her father disposed of his home and business interests in Covington, temporarily, and removed to Bloomington, Indiana. It was there that the widow met David Demaree Banta (1833–1896), whom she married June 11, 1856. Soon after the wedding, they went to Covington, Kentucky. He was admitted to the bar in 1857, and in October, the removed to Franklin, Indiana. The Bantas had two sons and one daughter.  She died May 1, 1907, in Chicago, Illinois, and was buried at Greenlawn Cemetery in Franklin, Indiana.

Selected works

As M. E. Banta
 Songs of home, 1895

References

Attribution

External links
 
 

1834 births
1907 deaths
19th-century American poets
19th-century American women writers
Writers from Cincinnati
American women poets
American travel writers
American women travel writers
Wikipedia articles incorporating text from A Woman of the Century